Clara Bata Ogunbiyi CFR (born 27 February 1948) is a Nigerian jurist and former Justice of the Supreme Court of Nigeria.

Early life
Justice Clara was born on February 27, 1948, at Lassa, a town in Borno State, Northeastern Nigeria.
She obtained a diploma certificate in Law from Ahmadu Bello University in June 1971 before she later enrolled for a bachelor's degree in Law from the same university in June 1975 and was Call to the bar, the Nigerian bar in 1976, the same year she graduated from the Nigerian Law School.
She completed the compulsory one year Youth Service in June 1977.
She proceeded to the University of Hull where she received a master's degree in Criminology in 1983 and a Post Graduate Diploma certificate in Education from the University of Maiduguri.

Law career
She began her Law career in October 1971 as Assistant Registrar at the High Court of Justice Maiduguri where she rose to the position of state Counsel in 1977 and August 1979, she became a Senior State Counsel, a position she held until her appointment as Deputy Director of Public Prosecution.
In December 1984, she became the Director of Civil Litigation, a position she held until she was appointed as Judge of the High Court of Borno State.
In October 2002, she was appointed to the bench of the Nigerian courts of appeal as Justice and on 2012, she was appointed to the bench of the Supreme Court of Nigeria as justice, along with Justice Musa Datijo Muhammad.

Membership
Member, Nigerian Bar Association
Member, International Bar Association
Member, Nigerian Body of Benchers

National Honours=Commander of the Federal Republic CFR 2022

Personal life
She is married to Dr (Chief) Bamigboye Ezekiel Ogunbiyi.

References

1948 births
Living people
Ahmadu Bello University alumni
Alumni of the University of Hull
Nigerian jurists
Supreme Court of Nigeria justices
University of Maiduguri alumni